Moira O'Deorain, better known as simply Moira, is a playable character in Blizzard Entertainment's Overwatch (2016), a team-based multiplayer shooter video game. In the game, Moira serves as a healer who can refill her resources by damaging enemies with her main attack. Within the game's story, she is an Irish geneticist who refuses to let any "ethical constraints" interfere with scientific advancement.

Conception and design
Moira was announced at BlizzCon 2017 as the game's 26th hero on November 3, 2017, and was made available to play on the Public Test Region a few days later. Moira was added for all players in all regions on November 16, 2017. Kaplan said that Moira had been in the works for months well prior to this, having anticipated that the Overwatch player base had been asking for another healer character. Kaplan believed that Moira's fit as a healer depends on the proper team composition where the team generally stays in close proximity, but that her abilities can help support those that tend to separate from the group, like Genji.

Art-wise, she was envisioned by Arnold Tsang to be a warlock- or mage-like character, with robes, sleeves and hand motions that evoked a use of magic. This subsequently led to some difficulty with her character animations, especially with her sleeves; while they had done long flowing clothes before for Reaper, animating the sleeves with the complex hand movements took several months. This particularly was true for her Legendary skins, which animator Hak Lee said took between three and five months to properly animate. Moira's animations in-game were found by some journalists to be close references to various anime, such as her running animation matching that of Naruto Uzumaki from the anime Naruto. Overwatch lead writer Michael Chu acknowledged that many members of Blizzard's animation team were anime fans and some references had filtered into characters and customization items; for Moira, Chu believed the anime-like touches helped to make her character visually distinctive among a fast-paced battle within the game.

Moira is voiced by Genevieve O'Reilly, an Irish-Australian actress that Chu said was perfect for the role. As stated by Chu, the team was interested in a new support character when looking at the landscape of the game, as well as "less benevolent healer".

Story and character 
Originally from Dublin, Moira O'Deorain made waves in the scientific community more than a decade prior to the events of the game, after publishing a controversial paper detailing a methodology for creating custom genetic programs that could alter DNA at a cellular level. Most scientists found her research dangerous due to its perceived ethical shortfalls, with some even going so far as to accuse her of having the same obsession with scientific advancement that started the Omnic Crisis. Adding to the controversy, other geneticists were unable to reproduce the results of her research. With her career stalled, Moira received a lifeline from an unlikely source: Blackwatch, the covert ops division of Overwatch under the command of Gabriel Reyes. Her involvement with Blackwatch was kept a secret until inquiries following an incident in Venice revealed her work, forcing Overwatch to publicly disavow any ties to her or her work. After Overwatch disbanded, Moira was employed by the Ministries, the scientific collective that founded the city of Oasis in southern Iraq, as the head of the Ministry of Genetics. She was also financed by Talon, and (along with Doomfist and Reaper) is among the members of its ruling council who appear in the game. Her origin story video reveals that she is responsible for transforming Gabriel Reyes into Reaper. She had made an appearance in Doomfist's introductory comic, released earlier in 2017.

Gameplay 
Within the game, Moira is considered a Support character. Overwatch executive producer Jeff Kaplan has labeled Moira as a "hybrid" hero; while categorized as a healer, she possesses abilities to also deal a high amount of damage. Her main weapon is the Biotic Grasp, which uses biotic energy to heal allies in a small cone in front of her; the biotic energy is gained by applying the Grasp to opponents to drain their health in a similar cone. Her skills include Fade, which allows her to travel while invisible and invulnerable for a short distance, and Biotic Orb, a bouncing sphere that can either heal allies or damage enemies depending on which setting the player chooses. Her ultimate ability is Coalescence, a beam that heals all allies and damages all opponents it passes, bypassing any shields that may be in place. Moira has a medium range; while her biotic energy meter in the middle of the screen doesn't deplete quickly, it refills slowly unless the player drains an enemy, which makes her more vulnerable.

References

External links
Official character page

Female characters in comics
Female characters in video games
Female video game villains
Fictional characters with heterochromia
Fictional geneticists
Fictional Irish people in video games
Fictional scientists in video games
Overwatch characters
Video game characters introduced in 2017
Fictional characters with healing abilities
Fictional United Nations personnel